Kristian Brining (born 16 November 1993) is a former professional rugby league footballer who played as a  for the York City Knights in the Betfred Championship, and the Salford Red Devils in the Super League.

Brining started at York aged 12 with a scholarship and became the club's youngest-ever player when he made his début in April 2011. In 2017 he made his Salford Super League début against the Wigan Warriors. He returned to York in 2019.

After suffering a series of injuries, Brining retired from the sport in April 2022, aged 28.

References

External links
Salford Red Devils profile
SL profile
Salford Red Devils sign Kris Brining from York City Knights

1993 births
Living people
English rugby league players
Rugby league hookers
Rugby league players from Yorkshire
Salford Red Devils players
Sportspeople from Scarborough, North Yorkshire
York City Knights players